Phoma narcissi is a fungal plant pathogen of Narcissus, Hippeastrum and other Amaryllidaceae,
where it causes a leaf scorch, neck rot and red leaf spot disease

Taxonomy 
The USDA's Fungal Database states that P. narcissi may be a synanamorph of Stagonosporopsis curtisii (Peyronellaea curtisii (Berk.) Aveskamp, Gruyter & Verkley).

References

External links 
 Species Fungorum
 USDA ARS Fungal Database
 Mycobank

Fungal plant pathogens and diseases
microspora
Fungi described in 1993